The 1991–92 NBA season was the Warriors' 46th season in the National Basketball Association, and 29th in the San Francisco Bay Area. On the first day of the regular season, Run TMC was broken up when the Warriors traded star guard Mitch Richmond to the Sacramento Kings in exchange for top draft pick, and 6' 8" Syracuse forward Billy Owens, who was selected 3rd overall by the Kings in the 1991 NBA draft. Owen's additional height compared to Richmond's 6' 5" height was the size that head coach Don Nelson believed would complete the team. Nelson said he "was under pressure to get [the team] bigger" to improve the Warriors from a good team to a great one. "I’d never make that trade again", Nelson lamented. The Warriors started their season winning their first four games, then won 11 of their 15 games in February including an 8-game winning streak. The team held a 29–15 record at the All-Star break, and finished second in the Pacific Division with a 55–27 record, the most wins in a season for the franchise since 1975–76.

Chris Mullin averaged 25.6 points, 5.6 rebounds and 2.1 steals per game, while Tim Hardaway averaged 23.4 points, 10.0 assists and 2.0 steals per game. Mullin was named to the All-NBA First Team, while Hardaway was selected to the All-NBA Second Team, and Nelson was named Coach of the Year. In addition, Owens provided the team with 14.3 points and 8.0 rebounds per game, and was named to the NBA All-Rookie First Team, while sixth man Sarunas Marciulionis contributed 18.9 points and 1.6 steals per game off the bench, and Rod Higgins provided with 10.2 points per game off the bench, but only played just 25 games due to a wrist injury. Mullin and Hardaway were both selected for the 1992 NBA All-Star Game, with Nelson coaching the Western Conference. Mullin also finished in sixth place in Most Valuable Player voting, while Hardaway finished in eighth place, Owens finished in third place in Rookie of the Year voting, and Marciulionis finished in second place in Sixth Man of the Year voting.

However, in the Western Conference First Round of the playoffs, the Warriors lost in four games to the 6th-seeded Seattle SuperSonics, losing the final two games by just four points. Following the season, Higgins signed as a free agent with the Sacramento Kings during the next season, and second-year guard Mario Elie signed with the Portland Trail Blazers.

Draft picks

Roster

Regular season

Season standings

y – clinched division title
x – clinched playoff spot

z – clinched division title
y – clinched division title
x – clinched playoff spot

Record vs. opponents

Game log

Playoffs

|- align="center" bgcolor="#ffcccc"
| 1
| April 23
| Seattle
| L 109–117
| Billy Owens (25)
| Billy Owens (11)
| Tim Hardaway (6)
| Oakland–Alameda County Coliseum Arena15,025
| 0–1
|- align="center" bgcolor="#ccffcc"
| 2
| April 25
| Seattle
| W 115–101
| Tim Hardaway (23)
| Billy Owens (12)
| Chris Mullin (6)
| Oakland–Alameda County Coliseum Arena15,025
| 1–1
|- align="center" bgcolor="#ffcccc"
| 3
| April 28
| @ Seattle
| L 128–129
| Sarunas Marciulionis (27)
| Billy Owens (7)
| Hardaway, Marciulionis (8)
| Seattle Center Coliseum14,252
| 1–2
|- align="center" bgcolor="#ffcccc"
| 4
| April 30
| @ Seattle
| L 116–119
| Tim Hardaway (27)
| Chris Gatling (12)
| Tim Hardaway (11)
| Seattle Center Coliseum14,252
| 1–3
|-

Player statistics

Season

Playoffs

Awards and records
 Chris Mullin, NBA All-Star Game
 Tim Hardaway, NBA All-Star Game
 Don Nelson, NBA Coach of the Year Award
 Chris Mullin, All-NBA First Team
 Tim Hardaway, All-NBA Second Team
 Billy Owens, NBA All-Rookie Team 1st Team

Transactions

References

See also
 1991–92 NBA season

Golden State Warriors seasons
Golden
Golden
Golden State